Eder Giovanni Franchini Pastén (born 26 July 1988) is a Chilean footballer who plays as a defensive midfielder. Besides Chile, he has played in New Zealand.

Career
As a youth player, Franchini was with Huachipato and Universidad de Concepción until 2007. After having no chances to play professional football in his homeland, he switched to futsal, also representing the Chile national team in the 2008 Copa América.

In 2012, he emigrated to New Zealand and began a football career by signing with Manukau City. He has had an extensive career in that country, playing for clubs such as Waikato FC, Hamilton Wanderers, coinciding with his compatriot Alexis Cárcamo, Southern United, Waitakere United, Glenfield Rovers, among others. In the New Zealand football, he also coincided with another compatriots such as Nicolas Zambrano and Martín Canales.

In 2014, he returned to Chile for a brief stint and played for the Deportes Concepción futsal team in the Copa Libertadores, coinciding with Bernardo Araya, the most successful Chilean futsal player. At the tournament, they got a historical win against Uruguayan club Peñarol.

In April 2022, he signed with Ngaruawahia United.

Personal life
At the same time he was a player of Waitakere United, he worked as a painter in a his friends' company. He made his home in Auckland, New Zealand, and started a painting company in 2019.

References

External links
 
 
 Eder Franchini at EverythingForFootball.com
 Eder Franchini at Eurosport.com 

1988 births
Living people
Footballers from Santiago
Chilean men's futsal players
Deportes Concepción (Chile) footballers
Chilean footballers
Chilean expatriate footballers
WaiBOP United players
Hamilton Wanderers players
Southern United FC players
Waitakere United players
Manurewa AFC players
New Zealand Football Championship players
Chilean expatriate sportspeople in New Zealand
Expatriate association footballers in New Zealand
Association football midfielders